Job is an unincorporated community in Randolph County, West Virginia, United States. The earliest settler there was Thomas Summerfield, who came in 1784.

References

Unincorporated communities in Randolph County, West Virginia
Unincorporated communities in West Virginia